St. Peter's and St. Paul's Malankara Orthodox Church also known as Parumala Pally is a famous church in Kerala, India. This church is located in Parumala in Thiruvalla Taluk In Pathanamthitta district and is a  pilgrimage center and mausoleum of the Malankara Orthodox Syrian Church.

History
The village of Parumala is a small stretch of land on the shores of the river Pampa. Before the church was built, the Malankara Metropolitan, Joseph Mar Dionysius wanted to establish a seminary in the area. In 1885's a two-acre plot of land was donated by Arikupurathu Mathen Karnavar to Mar Dionysius. With the land there was already a temporary church built by the Arukupurathu Family. Mar Gregorios decided to  rebuild the temporary church  into a more befitting and beautiful church.

Mar Gregorios used the personal gifts he received as well as the donations from parishes to build a church and adjoining seminary building. On the feast of the Mother of God, Greogorios temporarily consecrated the church and celebrated the divine Eucharist in the presence of Dionysius.

The first building was called "Azhippura" and was used for teaching church functionaries for the Orthodox Church, including providing lessons in Syriac. Dionysios eventually passed the responsibility for the seminary to  Mar Gregorios in order to carry on the Syriac teaching sessions more efficiently and also to help him in other church matters. The Church is dedicated to the Apostles Peter and Paul.

Saint Gregorios of Parumala

This church contains the tomb of the first canonized Christian saint from India, Geevarghese Mar Gregorios of Parumala, who died on 2 November 1902 at the age of 54. In 1947 he was declared a saint of the Church by the Catholicos and Malankara Metropolitan Baselios Geevarghese II. Belief in his saintly qualities caused it to become a pilgrimage center for Christians and Hindus seeking his intercession.

Abraham Verghese of the New York Times wrote about his visit to the church saying

Present church
The present church, which can accommodate more than 2000 worshipers, was designed by acclaimed architect and award winner, Charles Correa. It is a circular design with an inner diameter of 39 meters. This circle is again divided into three segments by two chords of 16 meters length.

In 2018, under the direction of Fr. Ashwin Fernandes, the main altar wall of the church was iconographically adorned with the "largest icon painting in Malankara." The icon behind the throne includes Christ in the center, to the left, His Mother, Yoldath Aloho Mariam (Theotokos), to the right, the forerunner, Mor Yuhanon Mam'domo (Saint John the Baptist). Surrounding the three are the assembly of the apostles and disciples of Christ. Fluttering their wings above the crowd are the host of angels and archangels who ceaselessly glorify God.

External links 
 
 Malankara Orthodox Syrian Church

Photo  Gallery

References

 Saint Geevarghese Mar Gregorios
 Malankara Orthodox Syrian Church

Churches in Pathanamthitta district
Malankara Orthodox Syrian church buildings
Religious organizations established in 1895
Malankara Orthodox Syrian Church
19th-century churches in India
19th-century Oriental Orthodox church buildings